The 2022 Special Olympics World Winter Games were a cancelled international multi-sport event for athletes with intellectual disabilities planned to be held in Kazan, Russia on January 21–27. They would have been the 12th edition of the Special Olympics World Winter Games to be held by the Special Olympics International.

Host selection

The Games were originally planned to be held in Åre and Östersund, Sweden in 2021. However, on December 20, 2019, the Swedish Paralympic Committee announced that they would cancel their plans on conducting the Games there due to insufficient funds to organize the event. On June 29, 2020, it was announced that Kazan, Russia would host the 12th Special Olympics World Winter Games in 2022.

Postponement and cancellation

The Games would have been held between January 22–28, 2022 but was postponed to January 2023 due to the COVID-19 pandemic. Following the 2022 Russian invasion of Ukraine, the Special Olympics International decided to cancel the event due to logistical and athlete safety issues.

Sports 
A total of seven sports at five different venues were planned to be competed on the 2022 Special Olympics:

Venues 
Five venues were planned to be used for the 2022 Special Olympics:

References

External links 
Official website

Special Olympics
Special Olympics World Winter Games
Sports events postponed due to the COVID-19 pandemic
Multi-sport events cancelled due to the COVID-19 pandemic
Sports events affected by the 2022 Russian invasion of Ukraine